Louisville Thunder was an indoor soccer club based in Louisville, Kentucky that was one of the founding clubs competing in the American Indoor Soccer Association. Peter Mahlock served as President and General Manager and Keith Tozer was the head coach.  During the first season Tozer moved from just coaching to logging shifts as a player/coach.  In their debut season of 1984–1985, goalkeeper Rick Schweizer won the 'Goalkeeper of the Year' award, and made it on to the All-Star team.  The Louisville Thunder played its home games at the Broadbent Arena.
However, in 1987 after winning the AISA league championship over the Canton Invaders, the team disbanded due to ownership problems.
The team did produce several league all-stars during its existence including Rick Schweizer, Zoran Savic, Art Hughes and Chris Hellenkamp.

Coaches

 Keith Tozer (1984–87)

Individual player honors

1984–1985 Rick Schweizer – Goalkeeper of the Year
1984–1985 All-Star TEAM Rick Schweizer & Art Hughes
1985–1986 Zoran Savic – Top Points Scorer (81)
1985–1986 All-Star TEAM Zoran Savic & Art Hughes
1986–1987 All-Star TEAM Zoran Savic, Art Hughes &  Chris Hellenkamp

Year-by-year

See also
 Sports in Louisville, Kentucky

References

 
Defunct indoor soccer clubs in the United States
Soccer clubs in Kentucky
American Indoor Soccer Association teams
1984 establishments in Kentucky
1987 disestablishments in Kentucky
Association football clubs established in 1984
Association football clubs disestablished in 1987